Samuel Liebmann (November 12, 1799 – November 21, 1872) was a German-born American  brewer and founder of S. Liebmann Brewery (later Rheingold Breweries) in Brooklyn, New York. Introduced after his death, the main brand Rheingold Extra Dry was one of the most popular beer brands in New York City in the 1940s to 1960s.

Biography
Samuel Liebmann was born to a Jewish family in 1799 in the Aufhausen, a district of the municipality of Bopfingen, the son of Berta (née Fröhlich) and Joseph Liebmann. His father was a merchant and religious instructor. He had three brothers (Heinrich, David, and Leopold) and two sisters (Johanna, Sarah) and attended elementary school in Aufhausen. After the death of his father in 1832, Liebmann and his brother Heinrich left their hometown and bought the estate Schloss Schmiedelfeld which they operated with economic success.

Liebmann moved to Ludwigsburg in 1840. There he acquired the Gasthaus "Zum Stern" with attached brewery, which he also led successfully. He was a supporter of the revolutionary movement during the German Revolution which led to the government banning royal soldiers, the majority of his clientele, from visiting his establishment. This combined with the failure of the revolution led to his immigration to the United States. In 1850, he sent his son Joseph Liebmann to America to build a home; in 1854, he officially immigrated with the rest of his family to New York City.

He leased the Maasche Brewery on Meserole Street in Williamsburg, Brooklyn which he renamed as the S. Liebmann Brewery. After the lease expired, he established a new brewery under the same name on the corner of Forest and Bremen Street in Bushwick. Three years after the death of his wife in 1865, he retired from active management of the brewery giving the management of the brewery to his sons.

Personal life
In June 1828, Liebmann married Sara Wasserman Selz (April 11, 1801 – September 13, 1865 in Bushwick). They had six children:
 Bertha Leibmann Stein (born June 28, 1827), married Samuel Stein in 1859
 Rosa Leibmann Obermeyer (born July 28, 1929), married David Obermeyer in 1858, 7 children
Frederick Obermeyer (born 1859), died as a child
Theodore Obermeyer (born July 26, 1861), married Bertha Heller
Ernst Obermeyer (born December 20, 1863), married Henrietta Harris
Joseph Obermeyer (born May 20, 1865)
Edwin Obermeyer
Robert Obermeyer
Emmeline Obermeyer (born October 27, 1873), married to photographer Alfred Stieglitz
 Joseph Liebmann (December 20, 1831 – March 26, 1913 in New York City)
 Fanny Liebmann (born March 27, 1933), married Joseph Liebmann (her father's cousin) in 1861, 7 children
Betty Liebmann (born January 1, 1862), married Myron J. Fuerst
Clara Liebmann (born January 26, 1865), married Julius Rosenfeld, parents to writer Paul Rosenfeld
Sarah Liebmann (born January 11, 1864), married Leopold Cohn
Henry L. Liebmann, married Clara von Ende, divorced and remarried to Dolores Zohrab Liebmann
Lily Liebmann (born November 21, 1867), married Carl Gutmann
Martha Liebmann (born September 28, 1873), never married
Johanna Liebmann, died in infancy
 Henry Liebmann (December 6, 1836 – March 27, 1915 in New York City)
 Charles Liebmann (November 16, 1837 – June 12, 1928 in New York City)

Samuel Liebmann died in 1872 in his house in Williamsburg, Brooklyn. He is buried in Cypress Hills Cemetery in Brooklyn.

References

 Die Liebmann Brauerei in New York, retrieved August 15, 2014.
 Find a Grave: Samuel Liebmann, retrieved August 15, 2014.
 
 Carl Schlegel: Schlegel’s American Families of German Ancestry, S. 236ff. retrieved August 15, 2014.
 Bernhard Purin: "My Beer is Rheingold – the dry Beer". Die Liebmanns, Hermann Schülein und Miss Rheingold. In: Lilian Harlander, Bernhard Purin (Hg.): Bier ist der Wein dieses Landes. Jüdische Braugeschichten, Volk Verlag, München 2016, S. 207––229.
 The Liebmann Family and the New York Society for Ethical Culture, retrieved August 15, 2014.

1799 births
1872 deaths
American Jews
American brewers
German emigrants to the United States
American company founders
Liebmann family
People from Williamsburg, Brooklyn
19th-century American businesspeople